Transference is a psychological thriller adventure video game developed by SpectreVision and Ubisoft Montreal and published by Ubisoft for Microsoft Windows, PlayStation 4, Xbox One. It was released on September 18, 2018.

Plot and gameplay 
Transference is about a family struggling with some serious issues. It is set inside a corrupted simulation made by a brilliant but "troubled" scientist named Raymond (Maicon Blair). From the perspective of different family members, the simulation is constructed from the "brain data" of Raymond, his wife Katherine (Lindsay Burdge), and their young son Benjamin (Tyler Crumley), as they move through their home, discover their secrets and collect the evidence that they need to repair their lives.

Reception

Awards 
The game was nominated for "Best VR Game" at the Golden Joystick Awards, and for "Immersive Reality Game of the Year" at the D.I.C.E. Awards.

References

External links
 

Adventure games
Windows games
Virtual reality games
PlayStation 4 games
Horror video games
Xbox One games
Video games developed in Canada
Video games developed in the United States
2018 video games
Transhumanism in video games
Ubisoft games
Psychological thriller video games
Single-player video games